List of unsolved problems may refer to several notable conjectures or open problems in various academic fields:

Natural sciences, engineering and medicine
 Unsolved problems in astronomy
 Unsolved problems in biology
 Unsolved problems in chemistry
 Unsolved problems in geoscience
 Unsolved problems in medicine
 Unsolved problems in neuroscience
 Unsolved problems in physics

Mathematics, philosophy and information sciences
 Unsolved problems in mathematics
 Unsolved problems in statistics
 Unsolved problems in computer science
 Unsolved problems in information theory

Social sciences and humanities
 Problems in philosophy
 Unsolved problems in economics
 Unsolved problems in fair division
 Unsolved problems in linguistics

See also
 Cold case (unsolved crimes)
 List of ciphertexts
 List of NP-complete problems
 List of PSPACE-complete problems
 List of paradoxes
 List of undecidable problems
 List of unsolved deaths
 Lists of problems

 

Science-related lists
Lists of problems
Engineering